The 1969 Davis Cup was the 58th edition of the Davis Cup, the most important tournament between national teams in men's tennis. 32 teams entered the Europe Zone, 9 teams entered the Americas Zone, and 8 teams entered the Eastern Zone.

Brazil defeated Mexico in the Americas Inter-Zonal final, India defeated Japan in the Eastern Inter-Zonal final, and Great Britain and Romania were the winners of the two Europe Zones, defeating South Africa and the Soviet Union respectively.

In the Inter-Zonal Zone, Romania defeated India and Great Britain defeated Brazil in the semifinals, and then Romania defeated Great Britain in the final. Romania were then defeated by the defending champions United States in the Challenge Round. The final was played at the Harold Clark Courts in Cleveland, Ohio, United States on 19–21 September. This marked the first time the final was played on hard courts and the first final since 1937 not to feature Australia.

Americas Zone

North & Central America Zone

South America Zone

Americas Inter-Zonal Final
Brazil vs. Mexico

Eastern Zone

Zone A

Zone B

Eastern Inter-Zonal Final
India vs. Japan

Europe Zone

Zone A

Zone A Final
Great Britain vs. South Africa

Zone B

Zone B Final
Romania vs. Soviet Union

Inter-Zonal Zone

Draw

Semifinals
Romania vs. India

Great Britain vs. Brazil

Final
Great Britain vs. Romania

Challenge Round
United States vs. Romania

References

External links
Davis Cup Official Website

 
Davis Cups by year
Davis Cup
Davis Cup
Davis Cup
Davis Cup
Davis Cup
Davis Cup